Dale Coyne (born July 8, 1954 in Minooka, Illinois) is an IndyCar Series team owner and former Champ Car auto racing team owner and driver.

Driving career
Coyne made his CART debut in 1984 at Portland and failed to qualify. He attempted to make 5 other races that year but only made the field in one of them, the race at Mid-Ohio where he finished 14th in his first race.

He returned in 1985 and again failed to qualify or had mechanical issues that prevented him from qualifying in the first five races he attempted. The first race that season that he made was his first oval start, at Michigan International Speedway and he was knocked out after 40 laps due to engine trouble. Coyne made four more starts that season and was sidelined in all of them by mechanical problems.

Dale Coyne and his team built their new proprietary chassis, the DC-1, for 1986 but results did not substantially improve. The car missed the field in its first attempt at Phoenix and caught on fire in pit lane at Long Beach. It wasn't until September that the car managed to finish a race, with Coyne bringing home a 12th-place finish at Sanair Super Speedway. Coyne was earlier credited with 12th place at Cleveland even though he was taken out of the race by a broken half-shaft. The 2 points that he earned for these races would be the most he would earn in a season in his career and he was credited with 34th place in the championship standings.

The DC-1 was disposed of for 1987 and Coyne switched to the more reliable year-old March 86C chassis. However, Coyne again missed the first three races of the season and made his first start in June at Portland. He made 8 starts but only finished one race and did not earn any championship points.

Coyne returned with the same now two-year-old March in 1988 and after failing to qualify for the Phoenix race, Coyne made his first attempt to qualify for the Indianapolis 500, in 1988 but he failed to make that race as well. He made 9 starts in 14 attempts that year and finished two of them. He was credited with a single point and 12th place in the Miami race despite being knocked out by engine failure.

Coyne attempted to make the Indy 500 again in 1989 but missed the field. He also drove in the Pocono Raceway race but was knocked out after 4 laps by gearbox failure.

He returned to the cockpit in 1991 when he had no pay driver to fill his seat and made two starts in 3 attempts but again suffered mechanical issues in both races.

Team ownership

Coyne largely retired from competition in 1989 to field other drivers and formed Payton Coyne Racing in 1988 with Walter Payton.  In his early years of team ownership, Coyne launched some impressive careers, including that of Paul Tracy (1991) and Michel Jourdain Jr. (1997).  The perennial hopeful never had substantial funding and scored a then-best finish of 3rd at the 1996 U.S. 500 at Michigan International Speedway with veteran Roberto Moreno.  The result was matched in 2004 when Oriol Servia accomplished the feat at Mazda Raceway Laguna Seca.  Servia also scored the team's best finish in the points with 10th.

2007 was a breakout year for Dale Coyne Racing. With driver Bruno Junqueira behind the wheel, he posted three consecutive podium finishes (Zolder, Belgium; Assen, the Netherlands & Surfer Paradise, Australia) for the team and gave Dale Coyne Racing its highest finish ever with a second place in Zolder, Belgium in August.

With open wheel unification prior to the 2008 season, Dale Coyne Racing made the transition to the IndyCar Series for 2008 with Junqueira joined by rookie Mario Moraes

In 2009 season, Dale Coyne Racing entered one driver into the Indycar series, Justin Wilson in the #18. On July 5 Wilson won the Camping World Grand Prix at Watkins Glen and gave Coyne his first championship-level victory as either driver or owner.

In the current season, 2018, Dale Coyne Racing fields two cars. The number 18 entry is entered under the Dale Coyne Racing with Vasser-Sullivan banner and is driven by Sebastian Bourdais. The number 19 entry is shared between Brazilian driver Pietro Fittipaldi and Canadian Zachary Claman de Melo. In addition, Dale Coyne Racing intends to field further entries for the 2018 Indianapolis 500 for Pippa Mann and Conor Daly.

Racing record

American Open Wheel racing results
(key)

CART

Indianapolis 500

External links
 Dale Coyne Racing homepage
 Dale Coyne's driving stats at ChampCarStats.com

1954 births
Auto racing crew chiefs
Champ Car drivers
IndyCar Series team owners
Dale Coyne Racing
Living people
People from Minooka, Illinois
Racing drivers from Illinois
Dale Coyne Racing drivers